17-Dimethylaminoethylamino-17-demethoxygeldanamycin (17-DMAG) is a chemical compound which is a semi-synthetic derivative of the antibiotic geldanamycin.  It is being studied for the possibility of treating cancer.

References

Antibiotics
Macrocycles
1,4-Benzoquinones
Carbamates
Lactams
Ethers
Secondary alcohols
Conjugated dienes